Glaucocharis natalensis is a moth in the family Crambidae. It was described by George Hampson in 1919. It is found in South Africa, where it has been recorded from KwaZulu-Natal.

References

Endemic moths of South Africa
Diptychophorini
Moths described in 1919